Neil James Allison (born 20 October 1973), is an English football manager and former footballer,who played as a central defender. He notably in the Football League for Hull City and later managed North Ferriby United.

Career
Allison played in the Football League with Hull City, Swindon Town and Chesterfield, in the League of Ireland Premier Division for Sligo Rovers and in Singapore for Geylang United. His final eight seasons were spent with non-league sides Gainsborough Trinity, Ossett Town and North Ferriby United. He managed North Ferriby from 2007 to 2010.

References

External links

1973 births
Living people
English footballers
Footballers from Kingston upon Hull
Association football forwards
Hull City A.F.C. players
Sligo Rovers F.C. players
Swindon Town F.C. players
North Ferriby United A.F.C. players
Chesterfield F.C. players
Guiseley A.F.C. players
Gainsborough Trinity F.C. players
Ossett Town F.C. players
English Football League players